Glímufélagið Ármann is a multi-sports club in Reykjavík, Iceland. It was founded on 15 December 1888 in Reykjavík as an Icelandic wrestling team. Today it has departments in basketball, gymnastics, judo, power lifting, swimming, skiing, taekwondo and track & field.

History
Glímufélagið Ármann was founded on 15 December 1988 by a group of around 30 people. The main founders where Pétur Jónsson (1856–1908) and Pétur Helgi Hjálmarsson (1867–1941).

Basketball

Men's basketball

Árman's men's basketball team was one of the founding members of the top-tier basketball league in Iceland in 1952. It won its first and only national championship in 1976.

Women's basketball

Ármann women's basketball team won the inaugural women's national championship in 1953 and added two more in 1959 and 1960.

Football

Men's football

Trophies 
2. deild karla (1):
  1969

3. deild karla (1):
  1982
Source

Women's football

Trophies 
Icelandic Champions (1):
  1973
Source

Handball

Men's handball

Trophies 
Icelandic Champions (5):
  1945, 1949, 1952, 1953, 1954

1. deild karla: (3):
 1962, 1973, 1977

2. deild karla: (2):
 1982, 1984
Source

Women's handball

Trophies 
Icelandic Champions (12):
  1940, 1941, 1942, 1943, 1944, 1947, 1948, 1949, 1956, 1958, 1960, 1963

Icelandic Cup: (1):
 1976
Source

References

External links
 Official site

Sport in Reykjavík